The former United States Post Office in Punxsutawney is a historic post office building located at Punxsutawney, Jefferson County, Pennsylvania. It was designed by the Office of the Supervising Architect under James Knox Taylor and built between 1912 and 1914.  It is a two-story brick building with a raised basement in the Neo Classical Revival style.  It features a full Ionic order octastyle limestone portico with a coffered ceiling and single-step parapet gable. It housed the post office until 1998.

It was added to the National Register of Historic Places in 2000.

The building now houses the Punxsutawney Weather Discovery Center.

The current post office, built 1998, is located at 553 E. Mahoning St.

References

Punxsutawney
Government buildings completed in 1914
Buildings and structures in Jefferson County, Pennsylvania
National Register of Historic Places in Jefferson County, Pennsylvania